The South Yorkshire Joint Railway was a committee formed in 1903, between the Great Central Railway, the Great Northern Railway, the Lancashire and Yorkshire Railway, the Midland Railway and the North Eastern Railway to oversee the construction of a new railway in the Doncaster area of South Yorkshire, England. The five companies had equal rights over the line, each of the companies regularly working trains over it.

Passenger trains on the line ended in 1929; freight work continued on the line, with eight collieries served at peak. Most of the collieries closed by the 1990s; but the line remained important for coal transportation both north and southwards to the Aire and Trent Valley power stations.

History

Authorisation and operators
Parliamentary permission to build the line was authorised with the passing of the South Yorkshire Joint Railway Act on 14 August 1903, and the formation of the South Yorkshire Joint Line Committee; formed from the railway companies: NER, L&YR, GNR, MR, and GCR. The South Yorkshire Joint Railway act incorporated an earlier scheme, the Shireoaks Laughton & Maltby Railway (Act passed 9 August 1901), a venture of the GCR and MR companies.

In the grouping of 1923, the Midland and L&YR were grouped into the London, Midland and Scottish Railway (LMS), whilst the GCR, GER and GNR were all grouped into the London and North Eastern Railway (LNER).  It thus remained an LMS-LNER joint line until nationalisation into British Railways in 1948.

Route
The line ran from Kirk Sandall Junction on the Great Central's  –  (former South Yorkshire Railway) to join up with the Great Central and Midland Joint Railway at Dinnington junction. It opened to freight on 1 January 1909, and to passengers on 1 December 1910. The capital cost was almost £411,000.

The line initially served Markham Main, Yorkshire Main, Dinnington Main, Maltby Main, Thurcroft and Harry Crofts collieries.  The largest amount of coal traffic originating on the line was recorded in 1929, almost 3 million tons. This was the result of the new Firbeck and Harworth collieries coming into full production and their branch lines becoming part of the SYJR. This produced a net revenue for the SYJR of £81,000 – equal to about £5.3 million in 2020 prices, an astonishing figure for a line (excluding sidings) of just under . By the end of 1929, capital expenditure on the SYJR had reached more than £710,000. As of 2010, only Maltby colliery was still producing coal, around 1.2 million tonnes a year according to the owners, but this last one closed in March 2013.

The route used encounters hilly country, and there are three viaducts, the largest being at the village of Slade Hooton one over the East Coast Main Line at Potteric Carr and the last being on the now lifted  Harworth Branch passing over the A631 to the west of the village of Tickhill and, a rising gradient for most of its journey. The highest point of the line is in the vicinity of Brookhouse viaduct.

Maltby signal box which controlled train entry into and out of the colliery at Maltby is still operating and is the last mechanical Great Central type 5 designed signal box left on the line (built 1912), This box is actually within the town of Doncaster's boundary – so technically the box is the last mechanical signal box still in operation within the town of Doncaster.(See British Ordnance Survey map for Doncaster area village of Stainton)

Passenger services
The joint passenger service operated for just one year before the GNR services were discontinued, reducing the service to two GCR trains with an extra one on Saturday. Passenger traffic over the line was never great, with the largest total number of travellers – 60,220 – being recorded in 1913. The service became Saturdays-only in June 1917 until April 1920 but was suspended from April 1926 to July 1927 due to the 1926 general strike; this service was withdrawn altogether on 2 December 1929.

Present day
As of October 2020, the line, although only single track, is an important freight railway line; now coal traffic has ceased there is very little traffic over the route but recent traffic has been the transfer to store of LNER Mk4 coaches and DVTs in the Up side yard at Worksop. Network Rail operate their test trains over the route to and from Derby also. Route learning locomotives operate and the occasional off-route freight runs as well. There are plans to reroute the intermodal trains via Maltby over the South Yorkshire Joint line to the I-Port but no date has been given yet. Short spurs also connect the route with Doncaster Decoy Yard.

Doncaster International Railport, which opened in 2012 south-east of junction 3 of the M18 motorway, uses the line as its primary rail access point.

References

Notes

Sources

External links

Rail transport in South Yorkshire
Great Central Railway
British joint railway companies